During 2009, the Australian ABC Classic FM radio station conducted a survey of listeners' favourite symphonies. Participants were permitted to vote for their three preferred symphonies. The survey closed at the end of June 2009.

The works were broadcast (from number 100 to number 1) from 12–19 September 2009.

Survey summary

Programming
For more details about the works broadcast, see ABC Classic FM's programming notes:
Day 1: Numbers 100 to 86
Day 2: Numbers 85 to 71
Day 3: Numbers 70 to 58
Day 4: Numbers 57 to 47
Day 5: Numbers 46 to 34
Day 6: Numbers 33 to 23
Day 7: Numbers 22 to 13
Day 8: Numbers 12 to 1 (including a live concert featuring symphonies 5 to 1)

Only one movement from symphonies 5 to 2 was played during the live concert on day 8 (all other works were played in their entirety).

The complete performances of symphonies 5 to 2 were played on the day following the conclusion of the countdown (see here for programming details).

The countdown contained approximately 72 hours and 35 minutes of music (this total includes works 2 to 5 played in their entirety).

By Composer
The following 32 composers were featured in the Classic 100 Symphony countdown:

See also
Classic 100 Countdowns

References

Official ABC Classic FM Classic 100 Symphony site

Classic 100 Countdowns (ABC)
Lists of symphonies
2009 in Australian music